Mercer University is a private, coeducational university in Macon, Georgia, founded in 1833.

Mercer is the only university of its size in the United States that offers programs in eleven diversified fields of study: liberal arts, business, education, music, engineering, medicine, nursing, pharmacy, law, theology, and continuing and professional studies. Mercer enrolls approximately 8,300 students in its eleven colleges and schools.

Alumni
This is a list of notable Mercer alumni and employees.

Arts, education, media, and industry

Tom Abbott – broadcaster with Golf Channel and NBC Sports
Gregg Allman – musician, received an honorary degree in 2016
Brent Banks (Realtor) - House selling fool and good looking dude
Steve Berry – author of six novels including several New York Times bestsellers
Thomas P. Bishop – senior vice president, compliance officer and general counsel, Georgia Power, the largest electric utility in Georgia
John B. Black – president, East Georgia College
J. Buford Boone – Pulitzer Prize-winning author (1957); recognized for editorials against segregation
David Bottoms – Georgia Poet Laureate, 2000–2012
William H. Bruce – Mercer's first doctoral graduate (1890); president, Tarleton State University, 1899–1900; president, University of North Texas, 1906–1923
James C. Coomer – political scientist and author
John M. Couric – former UPI editor, PR executive with the National Association of Broadcasters; father of broadcast journalist Katie Couric
 Harry Stillwell Edwards – former editor, Macon Telegraph; author of 19 books, including the Southern classic Eneas Africanus
 Erick Erickson – political contributor for John King, USA on CNN
 Barbara (Willis) Gauthier – news anchor for WTVM in Columbus
Nancy Grace – legal commentator and guest host for Larry King Live; hosted her own show, Nancy Grace on CNN
Keitaro Harada – opera and orchestra conductor
Rufus Carrollton Harris – president, Tulane University, 1939–1960; president, Mercer University, 1960–1979, co-author of the GI Bill
John Hogan – founding president, Radio and Television News Directors Association, the world's largest organization devoted to broadcast journalism
Y. Lynn Holmes – president, Brewton-Parker College, 1983–1997
Budge Huskey – president and CEO, Coldwell Banker Real Estate LLC
 Malcolm Johnson – Pulitzer Prize-winning author (1949); his reports were the basis for On the Waterfront, which starred Marlon Brando
Tony Kemp — Executive Committee member, Phi Eta Sigma; currently Mercer's Senior Director of Academic Services
Anne B. Kerr – president, Florida Southern College
William Heard Kilpatrick – career educator; first president of the Bennington College board of trustees, 1931–1938
Landrum P. Leavell – president, New Orleans Baptist Theological Seminary, 1975–1995
Dr. Henry Lewis III – president, Florida Memorial University
Dr. Andrew Light – university professor, George Mason University, and Senior Adviser on Climate Change, U.S. Department of State; author and editor of 17 books on the intersection of the scientific and moral dimensions of environmental and technology policy

Reg Murphy – former president and vice chairman, National Geographic Society; publisher, Baltimore Sun; editor and publisher, San Francisco Examiner; editor, Atlanta Journal-Constitution; author of Uncommon Sense: The Achievement of Griffin Bell
William F. Ogburn – sociologist; former president of the American Sociological Society
George P. Oslin – former Western Union executive; invented the singing telegram in 1933
Lyman Ray Patterson – law professor and copyright scholar; former dean, Emory University School of Law
James Rachels – moral philosopher, university professor, and author; best known for his writing on euthanasia
Ed Roberts – designed the first commercially successful personal computer in 1975; known as "the father of the personal computer"
Ferrol Sams – widely read Southern author, known for Run with the Horsemen and Whisper of the River
Robert A. Saurberg, Jr. – president, Condé Nast
Neil Skene – president and publisher, Congressional Quarterly, 1990–1997
Eugene W. Stetson – banker and railway executive; organized the sale of Coca-Cola by Asa Griggs Candler to Ernest Woodruff in 1919; namesake of Mercer's Eugene W. Stetson School of Business and Economics
Steve Stoler – news reporter for WFAA in Dallas, Texas; noted for his coverage of the Branch Davidian Waco Siege in Waco, Texas
 Jack Tarver – publisher, Atlanta Journal-Constitution, 1958–1976; chairman, Associated Press, 1977–1983, namesake of the Jack Tarver Library on the Macon campus
Corbett H. Thigpen – psychiatrist; co-author of The Three Faces of Eve
Ellis Paul Torrance – educator known for pioneering research in creativity; namesake of the Torrance Center for Creativity and Talent Development
Phil Walden – music pioneer and founder of Capricorn Records; represented Otis Redding and The Allman Brothers
Martin Christopher White – president, Chowan University, 2003–present; former president, Gardner–Webb University, 1986–2002
 Jerry Wilson – former Senior Vice President and Chief Customer and Commercial Officer, the Coca-Cola Company

Law

For further alumni, see also: Walter F. George School of Law.
A. Harris Adams – Judge, Georgia Court of Appeals
Griffin Bell – Judge, United States Court of Appeals, 1962–1976; 72nd Attorney General of the United States, 1977–1979 
John S. Bell – Judge, Georgia Court of Appeals, 1960–1979; Chief Judge, Georgia Court of Appeals, 1969–1979
Reason C. Bell – Chief Justice, Georgia Supreme Court, 1943–1946; Associate Justice, 1932–1943 and 1946–1949; Judge, Georgia Court of Appeals, 1922–1932
William Augustus Bootle – Judge, Federal District Court for the Middle District of Georgia, 1954–2005; ordered the first admission of an African-American to the University of Georgia in 1961

G. Harrold Carswell – Judge, Federal District Court for the Northern District of Florida, 1958–1969; Judge, United States Court of Appeals for the Fifth Circuit, 1969–1970; unsuccessful nominee to the United States Supreme Court, 1970
Barry Cohen (attorney) – criminal defense attorney, 1966–2018
Linton McGee Collins – Judge, United States Court of Claims, 1964–1972
Brainerd Currie – law professor; noted conflict of laws scholar who developed the characterisation concept of governmental interest analysis
Thomas Hoyt Davis – Judge, Federal District Court for the Middle District of Georgia, 1945–1969
Sara L. Doyle – Judge, Georgia Court of Appeals
Beverly Daniel Evans, Jr. – Georgia Supreme Court Justice, 1904–1917; Federal District Judge for the Southern District of Georgia, 1917–1922
Albert John Henderson – Judge, United States Court of Appeals, 1979–1999; Judge, Federal District Court for the Northern District of Georgia, 1968–1979
Archibald Battle Lovett – Judge, Federal District Court for the Southern District of Georgia, 1941–1945
Scott D. Makar – Florida Solicitor General
M. Yvette Miller – Judge, Georgia Court of Appeals; the first African-American woman to serve on the court
Carlton Mobley – Chief Justice, Georgia Supreme Court, 1972–1974; Associate Justice, 1954–1972; United States Representative, Georgia's 6th Congressional district, 1932–1933
Michael J. Moore – United States Attorney, Federal District Court for the Middle District of Georgia
Willie Louis Sands – Judge, Federal District Court for the Middle District of Georgia; the first African-American to serve on the court
Jay Sekulow – chief counsel, American Center for Law and Justice
Evett Simmons – former president, National Bar Association
Hugh Thompson – Georgia Supreme Court Justice
Marc T. Treadwell – Judge, Federal District Court for the Middle District of Georgia
L. Lin Wood – attorney and conspiracy theorist on President Donald Trump's legal team tasked with overturning the results of the 2020 U.S. presidential election

Politics

U.S. senators
Four Mercerians have served as United States Senators, all from Georgia.
Walter F. George – United States Senator from Georgia, 1922–1957, served as President pro tempore, 1955–1957; namesake of Mercer's Law School
Thomas W. Hardwick – United States Senator from Georgia, 1915–1919; Governor of Georgia, 1921–1923; as Governor, appointed Rebecca L. Felton as the first female United States Senator
Thomas E. Watson – United States Representative, Georgia's 10th Congressional district, 1891–1893; United States Senator from Georgia, 1921–1922
William S. West – United States Senator from Georgia, 1914–1914

Governors
Eleven Mercerians have served as Governors: six of Georgia, two of Alabama, and one each of New Hampshire, Puerto Rico, and Texas.
Ellis Arnall – Governor of Georgia, 1943–1947
Allen D. Candler – Governor of Georgia, 1898–1902; United States Representative, Georgia's 9th Congressional district, 1883–1891; namesake of Candler County, Georgia
Nathan Deal – United States Representative, Georgia's 9th Congressional district, 1993–2010; served as Governor of Georgia from 2011 to 2019
Thomas W. Hardwick – United States Senator from Georgia, 1915–1919; Governor of Georgia, 1921–1923; as Governor, appointed Rebecca L. Felton as the first female United States Senator
Richard B. Hubbard – Governor of Texas, 1876–1879; US Ambassador to Japan, 1885–1889
William D. Jelks – Governor of Alabama, 1901–1907
Henry Dickerson McDaniel – Governor of Georgia, 1883–1886
William J. Northen – Governor of Georgia, 1890–1894; president, Southern Baptist Convention, 1899–1901; served as a Mercer trustee for 44 years, 1869–1913
Chauncey Sparks – Governor of Alabama, 1943–1947
Meldrim Thomson, Jr. – Governor of New Hampshire, 1973–1979
Blanton Winship – Governor of Puerto Rico (1934–1939)

U.S. representatives
Twenty-one Mercerians have served as United States representatives; the most recent (as of 2021) was Scott Rigell of Virginia.  Seventeen were from Georgia, three from Florida, and one from Virginia.
Doug Barnard – United States Representative, Georgia's 10th Congressional district, 1977–1993
Allen D. Candler – Governor of Georgia, 1898–1902; United States Representative, Georgia's 9th Congressional district, 1883–1891; namesake of Candler County, Georgia
Edward E. Cox – United States Representative, Georgia's 2nd Congressional district, 1925–1952
Nathan Deal – United States Representative, Georgia's 9th Congressional district, 1993–2010; served as Governor of Georgia from 2011 to 2019
Martin J. Crawford – United States Representative, Georgia's 2nd Congressional district, 1855–1861; Representative to the Confederate Provisional Congress, 1861–1862; Justice, Supreme Court of Georgia, 1880–1883
Robert W. Everett – United States Representative, Georgia's 7th Congressional district, 1891–1893
Phillip M. Landrum – United States Representative, Georgia's 9th Congressional district, 1953–1977
Thomas G. Lawson – United States Representative, Georgia's 8th Congressional district, 1891–1897
Rufus E. Lester – United States Representative, Georgia's 1st Congressional district, 1889–1906
Charles L. Moses – United States Representative, Georgia's 4th Congressional district, 1891–1897
James W. Overstreet – United States Representative, Georgia's 1st Congressional district, 1906–1907 and 1917–1923
Homer C. Parker – United States Representative, Georgia's 1st Congressional district, 1931–1935
Scott Rigell – United States Representative, Virginia's 2nd Congressional district, 2011–2017
Seaborn Roddenbery – United States Representative, Georgia's 2nd Congressional district, 1910–1913
Dwight L. Rogers – United States Representative, Florida's 6th Congressional district, 1945–1954
William J. Sears – United States Representative, Florida's 4th Congressional district, 1915–1929; United States Representative, an at-large Florida district, 1933–1937
Malcolm C. Tarver – United States Representative, Georgia's 7th Congressional district, 1927–1947
Carl Vinson – United States Representative for over 50 years, 1914–1965; long-time Chairman, House Armed Services Committee; has been called the "patriarch of the armed services" and the "father of the two-ocean navy"; namesake of the 
Thomas E. Watson – United States Representative, Georgia's 10th Congressional district, 1891–1893; United States Senator from Georgia, 1921–1922
J. Mark Wilcox – United States Representative, Florida's 4th Congressional district, 1933–1939
John S. Wood – United States Representative, Georgia's 9th Congressional district, 1931–1935 and 1945–1953; Chairman, House Un-American Activities Committee, 1949–1953

Other
Brad Bryant – Superintendent of the Georgia public schools, one of Georgia's eight statewide executive officials, 2010–2011
Cathy Cox – Georgia Secretary of State, 1999–2007; first woman elected to this position
Walter C. Dowling – United States Ambassador to South Korea, 1956–1959; United States Ambassador to Germany, 1959–1963
Winfred Dukes – Georgia State Representative
John Oxendine – Georgia Insurance Commissioner, 1995–2011
John Peyton – Mayor, Jacksonville, Florida, the most populous city in Florida and the thirteenth most populous in the United States, 2003–2011
Charles "Jack" Pritchard – United States Ambassador and Special Envoy for Negotiations to North Korea, 2001–2003
Sandra L. Thurman – Director, Office of National AIDS Policy, 1997–2001; the first Presidential Envoy for AIDS Cooperation, 2000–2001; referred to as the nation's "AIDS czar" in the administration of President Bill Clinton
William Usery Jr. – United States Secretary of Labor, 1976–1977
Julian Webb – Member of the Georgia State Senate from 1963 to 1974 and the Georgia Court of Appeals from 1974 to 1979.
Samuel J. Welsch – Member of the Georgia House of Representatives, the Georgia State Senate, and mayor of Marietta, Georgia.

Military

John Birch – missionary, U.S. Army intelligence officer, and OSS agent in China during World War II; namesake of the John Birch Society
Ross W. Crossley, Brigadier General, U.S. Army – Commanding General, V Corps Artillery, 1983–85; Chief of Staff, V Corps, 1985–88
Benjamin S. Griffin, General, U.S. Army – Commanding General, U.S. Army Materiel Command, 2004–08
Richard E. Hawes, Rear Admiral, U.S. Navy – commanded several vessels during World War II; recipient of the Navy Cross; namesake of the USS Hawes
Alexander T. Hawthorn, Brigadier-General, C.S. Army – Commander, Hawthorn's Brigade, Churchill's Division, Trans-Mississippi Department, 1863–65
Michael L. Howard, Brigadier General, U.S. Army – Deputy Commanding General, 10th Mountain Division, 2013–present; Commander, 4th Brigade (Airborne), 25th Infantry Division, the only airborne brigade in the Pacific Theater, 2008–10
Claude M. Kicklighter, Lieutenant General, U.S. Army – Commanding General, United States Army, Pacific, 1989–91; after military retirement, served in senior civilian positions in the Department of Defense and Department of Veterans Affairs; Assistant Secretary, Department of Veterans Affairs, 2001–05; Inspector General, Department of Defense, 2007–08
C. Stewart Rodeheaver, Brigadier General, U.S. Army – Deputy Commanding General, First United States Army, 2006–09
William T. Thielemann, Brigadier General, U.S. Army – Commander, 48th Infantry Brigade (Mechanized), Georgia Army National Guard, 1995–97
George J. Walker, Brigadier General, U.S. Army – Assistant Chief of Staff for Intelligence, U.S. Army Forces Command, 1987–89; member, Military Intelligence Hall of Fame

Perry L. Wiggins, Lieutenant General, U.S. Army – Commanding General, Fifth United States Army, 2013–present; Commander, 1st Infantry Division and Fort Riley, 2008–09
Blanton Winship, Major General, U.S. Army – The Judge Advocate General (TJAG), 1931–33; Governor of Puerto Rico, 1934–39

Science
Kevin Greenaugh – nuclear engineer, the first African-American to receive a PhD from the Clark School of Engineering at the University of Maryland, College Park
 Godwin Maduka – MD and founder of Las Vegas Pain Institute and Medical Center

Other public service
Ed Bacon (Episcopal priest) – rector emeritus of All Saints Episcopal Church in Pasadena, California
Betty Cantrell – Miss America 2016 
Charles Kelsey Dozier – missionary and founder of Seinan Gakuin University in Japan 
J. Truett Gannon – influential Baptist minister; chairman, Truett-McConnell College Board of Trustees, 1985–1987; chairman, Midwestern Baptist Theological Seminary Board of Trustees, 1987–1990; president, Georgia Baptist Convention, 1990–1992
 Jenna Jackson (CLA 2011), Miss University of Georgia 2013
 Skylar Mack - student imprisoned in the Cayman Islands for Covid-19 quarantine breach
Louie D. Newton – influential Baptist minister; president, Southern Baptist Convention, 1947–1948; president, Georgia Baptist Convention, 1950–1951; pastor of Druid Hills Baptist Church in Atlanta for more than 40 years; namesake of Mercer's Newton Hall, a large chapel on the Macon campus
Lamar R. Plunkett – past chair, University System of Georgia Board of Regents; past chair, Mercer Board of Trustees; former Georgia state senator; namesake of the Lamar R. Plunkett Lecture Series at the University of West Georgia; namesake of the Lamar R. Plunkett Award presented by the Southern Regional Education Board
Steadman V. Sanford – former chancellor, University System of Georgia; namesake of Sanford Stadium at the University of Georgia

Athletics

Rob Belloir – former Major League Baseball infielder for the Atlanta Braves
William Brennan – former Major League Baseball pitcher
Cindy Brogdon –  former basketball player who competed in the 1976 Summer Olympics
Billy Burns – Major League Baseball outfielder in the New York Yankees organization
Wally Butts – head football coach, University of Georgia (1939–1960), athletic director (1939–1963); member of the Georgia Sports Hall of Fame and the College Football Hall of Fame
Jimmy Carnes – head track & field coach, Furman University (1962–1964), University of Florida (1965–1976), U.S. Olympic team (1980); founding president of USA Track & Field (1980–1984)
Andrea Congreaves – women's basketball player in the WNBA and in Europe
Wesley Duke – former tight end for the Denver Broncos, 2005 AFC West Champions
Cory Gearrin - Major League Baseball pitcher for the New York Yankees
Hilda M. Hankerson-– high school basketball coach
Big James Henderson – powerlifter who competed in the International Powerlifting Federation and won five world bench press titles (1994–1998)
Kyle Lewis – Major League Baseball outfielder for the Seattle Mariners
Mike Mimbs – former Major League Baseball pitcher for the Philadelphia Phillies
Sam Mitchell – head coach, Toronto Raptors of the National Basketball Association (2004–2008); selected as the 2007 NBA Coach of the Year
Joe Pettini – former Major League Baseball infielder and coach
Bill Yoast – high school football coach made famous in the film Remember the Titans''

References